Happy Camp High School is a public high school located in Happy Camp, California.  It is a member of the Siskiyou Union High School District.  The school's mascot is the Indians.

References

External links
 
 Siskiyou Union High School District website

Public high schools in California
Schools in Siskiyou County, California